Rezaabad-e Sharqi (also Romanized as Reẕāābād-e Sharqī; also known as Reẕāābād, Chāh-e Reẕāābād, Rāzābād, and Rezāābād) is a village in Dughayi Rural District, in the Central District of Quchan County, Razavi Khorasan Province, Iran. At the 2006 census, its population stoppppp

References 

Populated places in Quchan County